Burbach is a municipality in the Siegen-Wittgenstein district, in North Rhine-Westphalia, Germany.

Geography
Burbach is located in Siegen-Wittgenstein district on the river Heller, about 15 km south of Siegen. Burbach also is a community in the southern part of the state Northrhine Westphalia.

Constituent divisions

The community of Burbach consists of the following subdivisions: Burbach, Gilsbach, Holzhausen, Lippe, Lützeln, Niederdresselndorf, Oberdresselndorf, Wahlbach, Würgendorf.

Politics

Municipal council

The council's 32 seats are apportioned thus, in accordance with municipal elections held on 25 May 2014:
CDU 19 seats
SPD 10 seats
Greens 3 seats

Coat of arms
Burbach's civic coat of arms might heraldically be described thus: Party per pale, dexter in azure spangled with billets Or a two-tailed lion rampant Or armed and langued gules, sinister in Or three lozenges sable arranged vertically.

The lion stands for the princely House of Nassau-Siegen. The three lozenges (diamonds) come from the Lords of Seelbach, who held sway over the community in the Middle Ages.

The current civic coat of arms is based on the now abolished Amt's arms, and was granted in 1970. The local court for Burbach and Seelbach was already using the combination of a lion and diamonds by the 15th century.

Economy and infrastructure

Transport
Running through the northeast of the municipal area is Autobahn A 45 (Sauerlandlinie). As well, the municipal area is connected in the east to Federal Highway (Bundesstraße) B 54, which runs from Siegen towards Limburg an der Lahn. Bus connections are provided by the Westphalia-South Transport Community (Verkehrsgemeinschaft Westfalen-Süd; VGWS) running to all neighbouring communities.

The community is directly connected to the Deutsche Bahn railway network by the Hellertalbahn railway running from Haiger to Betzdorf.

In the southern municipal area lies the Siegerland Airport.

Established businesses
Well known businesses in Burbach are:
 Expert Klein
 Foto-Drogerie-Kosmetik Bräuer
 Georgi Transporte
 Hering Bau (tracklaying)
 Heusel Kälte- und Klimatechnik
 SOPREMA-KLEWA Dachbaustoffe
 MHP Mannesmann Präzisrohr
 Orica, Werk Würgendorf (formerly Dynamit Nobel AG)
 razorcom it service
 Rittal
 WaldrichSiegen
 IPG Photonics

Notable people
Notable people associated with the town include:
Cem Islamoglu, Turkish-German football player
Wilhelm Killing, mathematician
Dirk Müller, racing driver
Hermann Schmidt, German politician
Markus Waldrich, German football player

References

External links

  
 Burbach in the Kulturatlas Westfalen 
 Catholic parish 
 Protestantic parish 

Siegen-Wittgenstein